In linguistics, evidentiality is, broadly, the indication of the nature of evidence for a given statement; that is, whether evidence exists for the statement and if so, what kind. An evidential (also verificational or validational) is the particular grammatical element (affix, clitic, or particle) that indicates evidentiality. Languages with only a single evidential have had terms such as mediative, médiatif, médiaphorique, and indirective used instead of evidential.

Introduction

All languages have some means of specifying the source of information. European languages (such as Germanic and Romance languages) often indicate evidential-type information through modal verbs or other lexical words (adverbials) or phrases (English: it seems to me).

Some languages have a distinct grammatical category of evidentiality that is required to be expressed at all times. The elements in European languages indicating the information source are optional and usually do not indicate evidentiality as their primary function, thus they do not form a grammatical category. The obligatory elements of grammatical evidentiality systems may be translated into English, variously, as I hear that, I see that, I think that, as I hear, as I can see, as far as I understand, they say, it is said, it seems, it seems to me that, it looks like, it appears that, it turns out that, alleged, stated, allegedly, reportedly, obviously, etc.

Alexandra Aikhenvald (2004) reports that about a quarter of the world's languages have some type of grammatical evidentiality. She also reports that, to her knowledge, no research has been conducted on grammatical evidentiality in sign languages. Laura Mazzoni (2008) has since conducted a preliminary study on evidentiality in Italian Sign Language (LIS).

Many languages with grammatical evidentiality mark evidentiality independently from tense-aspect or epistemic modality, which is the speaker's evaluation of the information, i.e. whether it is reliable, uncertain, probable.

Grammatical evidentiality may be expressed in different forms depending on the language, such as through affixes, clitics, or particles. For example, Japanese has inferential evidentials and reportive markers that are realized as suffixes on a variety of mainly verbal predicates, and as grammaticalized nouns.

The use of evidentiality has pragmatic implications in languages that do not mark evidentiality distinctly from epistemic modality. For example, a person who makes a false statement qualified as a belief may be considered mistaken; a person who makes a false statement qualified as a personally observed fact will probably be considered to have lied.

In some languages, evidential markers also serve other purposes, such as indicating the speaker's attitude towards, or belief in, the statement. Usually a direct evidential marker may serve to indicate that the speaker is certain about the event stated. Using an indirect evidential marker, such as one for hearsay or reported information, may indicate that the speaker is uncertain about the statement, or doesn't want to take responsibility for its truth. A "hearsay" evidential may then have the undertone of "that's what they say; whether or not it's true is nothing I can take responsibility for".  In other languages, this is not the case. Therefore one should distinguish between such evidential markers that only mark source of knowledge, and such evidential markers that serve other functions, such as marking epistemic modality.

Evidentials can also be used to "deflect culpability" in a statement. In his dissertation on Nanti, a Peruvian Amazonian language, Lev Michael refers to an example in which a young girl is accidentally burned, and a community member questions her mother about how it happened. Her mother uses the evidential marker  which translates to "presumably," to deflect responsibility for the girl's mistake.

Some languages are borderline cases. For example, French is mostly like English in not having grammatical evidentiality, but does allow some ability to express it via inflection. It also happens in Portuguese:  vs. .

Types according to Aikhenvald

Following the typology of Alexandra Aikhenvald (2004, 2006), there are two broad types of evidential marking:

 indirectivity marking ("type I")
 evidential marking ("type II")

The first type (indirectivity) indicates whether evidence exists for a given statement, but does not specify what kind of evidence. The second type (evidentiality proper) specifies the kind of evidence (such as whether the evidence is visual, reported, or inferred).

Indirectivity (type I)

Indirectivity (also known as inferentiality) systems are common in Uralic and Turkic languages. These languages indicate whether evidence exists for a given source of information—thus, they contrast direct information (reported directly) and indirect information (reported indirectly, focusing on its reception by the speaker/recipient). Unlike the other evidential "type II" systems, an indirectivity marking does not indicate information about the source of knowledge: it is irrelevant whether the information results from hearsay, inference, or perception; however, some Turkic languages distinguish between reported indirect and non-reported indirect, see Johanson 2003, 2000 for further elaboration. This can be seen in the following Turkish verbs:

 (Johanson 2003: 275)

In the word geldi, the unmarked suffix -di indicates past tense. In the second word gelmiş, the suffix -miş also indicates past tense but indirectly. It may be translated into English with the added phrases obviously, apparently or as far as I understand. The direct past tense marker -di is unmarked (or neutral) in the sense that whether or not evidence exists supporting the statement is not specified.

Evidentiality (type II)

The other broad type of evidentiality systems ("type II") specifies the nature of the evidence supporting a statement. These kinds of evidence can be divided into such categories as:

 Witness vs. nonwitness
 Firsthand vs. secondhand vs. thirdhand
 Sensory
 Visual vs. nonvisual (i.e. auditory, olfactory, etc.)
 Inferential
 Reportative
 Hearsay
 Quotative
 Assumed

A witness evidential indicates that the information source was obtained through direct observation by the speaker. Usually this is from visual, or eyewitness, observation, but some languages also mark information directly heard with information directly seen. A witness evidential is usually contrasted with a nonwitness evidential which indicates that the information was not witnessed personally but was obtained through a secondhand source or was inferred by the speaker.

A secondhand evidential is used to mark any information that was not personally observed or experienced by the speaker. This may include inferences or reported information. This type of evidential may be contrasted with an evidential that indicates any other kind of source. A few languages distinguish between secondhand and thirdhand information sources.

Sensory evidentials can often be divided into different types. Some languages mark visual evidence differently from nonvisual evidence that is heard, smelled, or felt. The Kashaya language has a separate auditory evidential.

An inferential evidential indicates information was not personally experienced but was inferred from indirect evidence. Some languages have different types of inferential evidentials. Some of the inferentials found indicate:

 Information inferred by direct physical evidence
 Information inferred by general knowledge
 Information inferred/assumed because of speaker's experience with similar situations
 Past deferred realization

In many cases, different inferential evidentials also indicate epistemic modality, such as uncertainty or probability (see epistemic modality below). For example, one evidential may indicate that the information is inferred but of uncertain validity, while another indicates that the information is inferred but unlikely to be true.

Reportative evidentials indicate that the information was reported to the speaker by another person. A few languages distinguish between hearsay evidentials and quotative evidentials. Hearsay indicates reported information that may or may not be accurate. A quotative indicates the information is accurate and not open to interpretation, i.e., is a direct quotation. An example of a reportative from Shipibo (-ronki):

Typology of evidentiality systems

The following is a brief survey of evidential systems found in the languages of the world as identified in Aikhenvald (2004). Some languages only have two evidential markers while others may have six or more. The system types are organized by the number of evidentials found in the language. For example, a two-term system (A) will have two different evidential markers; a three-term system (B) will have three different evidentials. The systems are further divided by the type of evidentiality that is indicated (e.g., A1, A2, A3, etc.). Languages that exemplify each type are listed in parentheses.

The most common system found is the A3 type.

Two-term systems:

 A1. witness, nonwitness (e.g., Jarawara, Yukaghir languages, Mỹky, Godoberi, Kalasha-mun, Khowar, Yanam)
 A2. nonfirsthand, everything else (e.g., Abkhaz, Mansi, Khanty, Nenets, Enets, Selkup, Northeast Caucasian languages)
 A3. reported, everything else (e.g., Turkic languages, Tamil, Enga, Tauya, Lezgian, Kham, Estonian, Livonian, Tibeto-Burman languages, several South American languages)

Three-term systems:

 B1. visual sensory, inferential, reportative (e.g., Aymara, Shastan languages, Qiang languages, Maidu, most Quechuan languages, Northern Embera languages)
 B2. visual sensory, nonvisual sensory, inferential (e.g., Washo)
 B3. nonvisual sensory, inferential, reportative (e.g., Retuarã, Northern Pomo)
 B4. witness (direct), nonwitness (indirect), inferential, reportative (e.g., Tsezic and Dagestanian languages)

Four-term systems:

 C1. visual sensory, nonvisual sensory, inferential, reportative  (e.g., Tariana, Xamatauteri, Eastern Pomo, East Tucanoan languages)
 C2. visual sensory, inferential #1, inferential #2, reportative (e.g., Tsafiki, Pawnee, Ancash Quechua)
 C3. nonvisual sensory, inferential #1, inferential #2, reportative (e.g., Wintu)
 C4. visual sensory, inferential, reportative #1, reportative #2 (e.g., Southeastern Tepehuan)
 C5. witness (non-subjective, non-renarrative), inferential (subjective, non-renarrative), renarrative (non-subjective, renarrative), dubitative (subjective, renarrative) (e.g., Bulgarian)

Five-plus term systems:

 visual sensory, nonvisual sensory, inferential, reportative, assumed (e.g., Tuyuca, Tucano)
 witness, inferential, reportative, assumed, "internal support" (e.g., Nambikwaran languages)
 visual sensory, nonvisual sensory, inferential, reported, heard from known source, direct participation (e.g., Fasu)
 nonvisual sensory, inferential #1, inferential #2, inferential #3, reportative (e.g., Western Apache)
 inferential, anticipation, performative, deduction, induction, hearsay, direct observation, opinion, assumed, "to know by culture", "to know by internal" (Lojban)

Evidentiality marking and other categories

Evidential systems in many languages are often marked simultaneously with other linguistic categories. For example, according to Aikhenvald, a given language may use the same element to mark both evidentiality and mirativity, i.e., unexpected information. She claims that this is the case of Western Apache where the post-verbal particle lą̄ą̄ primarily functions as a mirative but also has a secondary function as an inferential evidential. This phenomenon of evidentials developing secondary functions, or other grammatical elements such as miratives and modal verbs developing evidential functions is fairly widespread. The following types of mixed systems have been reported:

 evidentiality with mirativity
 evidentiality with tense-aspect
 evidentiality with modality   (this is discussed in the next section below)

In addition to the interactions with tense, modality, and mirativity, the usage of evidentials in some languages may also depend on the clause type, discourse structure, and/or linguistic genre.

However, despite the intersection of evidentiality systems with other semantic or pragmatic systems (through grammatical categories), Aikhenvald believes that several languages do mark evidentiality without any grammatical connection to these other semantic/pragmatic systems. More explicitly stated, she believes that there are modal systems which do not express evidentiality, and evidential systems which do not express modality. Likewise, there are mirative systems which do not express evidentiality, and evidential systems which do not express mirativity.

Epistemic modality

Evidentiality is often considered to be a sub-type of epistemic modality (see, for example, Palmer 1986, Kiefer 1994). Other linguists consider evidentiality (marking the source of information in a statement) to be distinct from epistemic modality (marking the degree of confidence in a statement). An English example:

 I see that he is coming. (evidential)
 I know that he is coming. (epistemic)

For instance, de Haan (1999, 2001, 2005) states that evidentiality asserts evidence while epistemic modality evaluates evidence and that evidentiality is more akin to a deictic category marking the relationship between speakers and events/actions (like the way demonstratives mark the relationship between speakers and objects; see also Joseph 2003). Aikhenvald (2003) finds that evidentials may indicate a speaker's attitude about the validity of a statement but this is not a required feature of evidentials. Additionally, she finds that evidential-marking may co-occur with epistemic-marking, but it may also co-occur with aspectual/tense or mirative marking.

Considering evidentiality as a type of epistemic modality may only be the result of analyzing non-European languages in terms of the systems of modality found in European languages. For example, the modal verbs in Germanic languages are used to indicate both evidentiality and epistemic modality (and are thus ambiguous when taken out of context). Other (non-European) languages clearly mark these differently. De Haan (2001) finds that the use of modal verbs to indicate evidentiality is comparatively rare (based on a sample of 200 languages).

Terminology

Although some linguists have proposed that evidentiality should be considered separately from epistemic modality, other linguists conflate the two. Because of this conflation, some researchers use the term evidentiality to refer both to the marking of the knowledge source and the commitment to the truth of the knowledge.

In English (not grammaticalized)

Evidentiality is not considered a grammatical category in English because it is expressed in diverse ways and is always optional.  In contrast, many other languages (including Quechua, Aymara, and Yukaghir) require the speaker to mark the main verb or the sentence as a whole for evidentiality, or offer an optional set of affixes for indirect evidentiality, with direct experience being the default assumed mode of evidentiality.

Consider these English sentences:

 I am hungry.
 Bob is hungry.

We are unlikely to say the second unless someone (perhaps Bob himself) has told us that Bob is hungry. (We might still say it for someone incapable of speaking for themself, such as a baby or a pet.) If we are simply assuming that Bob is hungry based on the way he looks or acts, we are more likely to say something like:

 Bob looks hungry.
 Bob seems hungry.
 Bob would be hungry by now.
 Bob must be hungry by now.

Here, the fact that we are relying on sensory evidence, rather than direct experience, is conveyed by our use of the word look or seem.

Another situation in which the evidential modality is expressed in English is in certain kinds of predictions, namely those based on the evidence at hand. These can be referred to as "predictions with evidence". Examples:

 Look at those clouds! It's going to rain! (Compare "It will rain!").

Possible exceptions 

The suffix "-ish" can be considered to be a grammaticalized marker of uncertainty.

Western history of the concept

The notion of evidentiality as obligatory grammatical information was first made apparent in 1911 by Franz Boas in his introduction to The Handbook of American Indian Languages in a discussion of Kwakiutl and in his grammatical sketch of Tsimshianic. The term evidential was first used in the current linguistic sense by Roman Jakobson in 1957 in reference to Balkan Slavic (Jacobsen 1986:4; Jakobson 1990) with the following definition:

 "EnEns/Es evidential is a tentative label for the verbal category which takes into account three events — a narrated event (En), a speech event (Es), and a narrated speech event (Ens). The speaker reports an event on the basis of someone else's report (quotative, i.e. hearsay evidence), of a dream (revelative evidence), of a guess (presumptive evidence) or of his own previous experience (memory evidence)."

Jakobson also was the first to clearly separate evidentiality from grammatical mood. By the middle of the 1960s, evidential and evidentiality were established terms in linguistic literature.

Systems of evidentiality have received focused linguistic attention only relatively recently. The first major work to examine evidentiality cross-linguistically is Chafe & Nichols (1986). A more recent typological comparison is Aikhenvald (2004).

See also
 Epistemic modality
 Linguistic modality
 Mirativity
 Grammatical mood
 Epistemology

References

References and further reading 

 Aikhenvald, Alexandra Y. (2003). Evidentiality in typological perspective. In A. Y. Aikhenvald & R. M. W. Dixon (Eds.) (pp. 33–62).
 Aikhenvald, Alexandra Y. (2004). Evidentiality. Oxford: Oxford University Press. .
 Aikhenvald, Alexandra Y.; & Dixon, R. M. W. (1998). Evidentials and areal typology: A case-study from Amazonia. Language Sciences, 20, 241-257.
 Aikhenvald, Alexandra Y.; & Dixon, R. M. W. (Eds.). (2003). Studies in evidentiality. Typological studies in language (Vol. 54). Amsterdam: John Benjamins Publishing Company. ; .
Aikhenvald, Alexandra Y.; & Dixon, R. M. W. (Eds.). (2014) The Grammar of Knowledge: A Cross-Linguistic Typology. Oxford University Press.   
 Blakemore, D. (1994). Evidence and modality. In R. E. Asher (Ed.), The Encyclopedia of language and linguistics (pp. 1183–1186). Oxford: Pergamon Press. .
 Chafe, Wallace L.; & Nichols, Johanna. (Eds.). (1986). Evidentiality: The linguistic encoding of epistemology. Norwood, NJ: Ablex.
 Comrie, Bernard. (2000). Evidentials: Semantics and history. In L. Johanson & B. Utas (Eds.).
 De Haan, Ferdinand. (1999). Evidentiality and epistemic modality: Setting boundaries. Southwest Journal of Linguistics, 18, 83-101. (Online: www.u.arizona.edu/~fdehaan/papers/SWJL99.pdf).
 De Haan, Ferdinand. (2001). The relation between modality and evidentiality. In R. Müller & M. Reis (Eds.), Modalität und Modalverben im Deutschen. Linguistische Berichte, Sonderheft 9. Hamburg: H. Buske. . (Online: www.u.arizona.edu/~fdehaan/papers/lb01.pdf).
 De Haan, Ferdinand. (2005). Encoding speaker perspective: Evidentials. In Z. Frajzyngier & D. Rood (Eds.), Linguistic diversity and language theories. Amsterdam: Benjamins. , . (Online: www.u.arizona.edu/~fdehaan/papers/boulder.pdf).
 Faust, Norma. (1973). Lecciones para el aprendizaje del idioma shipibo-conibo [Lessons for learning the Shipibo-Conibo language]. Lima: Summer Institute of Linguistics.
 Guentchéva, Zlatka. (1996a). Introduction. In Z. Guentchéva (Ed.) (pp. 11–18).
 Guentchéva, Zlatka (Ed.). (1996b). L’Énonciation médiatisée. Bibliothèque de l’information grammaticale. Louvain: Éditions Peeters. ; .
 Johanson, Lars. (2000). Turkic indirectives. In L. Johanson & B. Utas (Eds.) (pp. 61–87).
 Jacobsen, W. H., Jr. (1986). The heterogeneity of evidentials in Makah. In W. L. Chafe & J. Nichols (Eds.) (pp. 3–28).
 Jakobson, Roman. (1990). Shifters and verbal categories. In On language (pp. 386–392). Cambridge, MA: Harvard University Press. (Original work published 1957).
 Johanson, Lars. (2003). Evidentiality in Turkic. In A. Y. Aikhenvald & R. M. W. Dixon (Eds.) (pp. 273–290).
 Johanson, Lars; & Utas, Bo (Eds.). (2000). Evidentials: Turkic, Iranian and neighboring languages. Berlin: Mouton de Gruyter. .
 Joseph, Brian D. (2003). Evidentials: Summation, questions, prospects. In A. Y. Aikhenvald & R. M. W. Dixon (Eds.) (pp. 307–327).
 Kiefer, Ferenc. (1994). Modality. In R. E. Asher (Ed.), The Encyclopedia of language and linguistics (pp. 2515–2520). Oxford: Pergamon Press.
 LaPolla, Randy J. (2003). Evidentiality in Qiang. In A. Y. Aikhenvald & R. M. W. Dixon (Eds.) (pp. 63–78).
 Maslova, Elena. (2003). Evidentiality in Yukaghir. In A. Y. Aikhenvald & R. M. W. Dixon (Eds.) (pp. 237–241).
 Mazzoni, Laura. (2008). Impersonamento ed evidenzialità in LIS. In L. Bertone (Ed.) La grammatica della lingua dei segni italiana. Atti dell'incontro di studio. Venezia 16-17 maggio 2007. Ed. Ca' Foscarina.
 McLendon, Sally. (2003). Evidentials in Eastern Pomo with a comparative survey of the category in other Pomoan languages. In A. Y. Aikhenvald & R. M. W. Dixon (Eds.) (pp. 101–129).
 Noël, Dirk. (2001). The passive matrices of English infinitival complement clauses: Evidentials on the road to auxiliarihood? Studies in Language, 25, 255-296.
 Palmer, F. R. (1986). Mood and modality. Cambridge: Cambridge University Press. , . (2nd ed. published 2001).
 Palmer, F. R. (1994). Mood and modality. In R. E. Asher (Ed.), The Encyclopedia of language and linguistics (pp. 2535–2540). Oxford: Pergamon Press.
 Slobin, D. I.; & Aksu, A. A. (1982). Tense, aspect and modality in the use of the Turkish evidential. In P. J. Hopper (Ed.), Tense-aspect: Between semantics & pragmatics. Amsterdam: Benjamins.
 Speas, Peggy. (2010) 'Evidentials as Generalized Functional Heads.' in A.M. diScuillo, ed. Interface Legibility at the Edge. Oxford University Press.
 Valenzuela, Pilar M. (2003). Evidentiality in Shipibo-Konibo, with a comparative overview of the category in Panoan. In A. Y. Aikhenvald & R. M. W. Dixon (Eds.) (pp. 33–61).
 Willet, Thomas L. (1988). A cross-linguistic survey of the grammaticalization of evidentiality. Studies in Language, 12, 51-97.

External links

 Language & Power (Evidentiality)
 Ferdinand de Haan's research on evidentiality
 Evidentiality bibliography
 world map of the language distribution of evidentiality
 Semantics: Modality and Evidentiality
 Evidentiality in Dena’ina Athabascan
 review of Aikhenvald & Dixon (2003) (Linguist List)
 review of Aikhenvald (2004) (Linguist List)

Grammatical moods
Pragmatics
Semantics
Evidence
Formal semantics (natural language)